Conamomum is an accepted genus of plants in the family Zingiberaceae and tribe Alpinieae.  Its native range is from Indochina to W. Malesia.

Species
Plants of the World Online currently includes:
 Conamomum citrinum Ridl. - type species
 Conamomum cylindraceum (Ridl.) Skornick. & A.D.Poulsen
 Conamomum cylindrostachys (K.Schum.) Skornick. & A.D.Poulsen
 Conamomum flavidulum (Ridl.) Skornick. & A.D.Poulsen
 Conamomum pierreanum (Gagnep.) Skornick. & A.D.Poulsen
 Conamomum rubidum (Lamxay & N.S.Lý) Skornick. & A.D.Poulsen
 Conamomum spiceum (Ridl.) Skornick. & A.D.Poulsen
 Conamomum squarrosum (Ridl.) Skornick. & A.D.Poulsen
 Conamomum utriculosum Ridl.
 Conamomum xanthophlebium (Baker) Skornick. & A.D.Poulsen
 Conamomum vietnamense N.S.Lý et al.

References

External Links 
 

Zingiberaceae
Flora of Indo-China
Flora of Malesia